The Aldergrove Kodiaks are a junior "B" ice hockey team based in Aldergrove, British Columbia, Canada. They are members of the Harold Brittain Conference of the Pacific Junior Hockey League (PJHL). The Kodiaks play their home games at Aldergrove Community Arena. Rick Harkins is the team's president and general manager, Chris Price is the coach.

History

The Kodiaks joined the league in 2008 as an expansion team. In its PJHL history, the team has won the PJHL Championship three times, in 2010, 2014 and 2017.  In 2012-13 the Kodiaks won the Brittain Conference Title and qualified for the PJHL Finals, where they lost to the Richmond Sockeyes.

Season-by-season record

Note: GP = Games played, W = Wins, L = Losses, T = Ties, OTL = Overtime Losses, Pts = Points, GF = Goals for, GA = Goals against

Cyclone Taylor Cup
British Columbia Jr B Provincial Championships

Awards and trophies
PIJHL Championship
2009-10 ; 2013-14 ; 2016-17

Executive of the Year
Rick Harkins: 2009-10

Most Inspirational Player
Chris Price: 2009-10

External links
Official website of the Aldergrove Kodiaks

Pacific Junior Hockey League teams
Ice hockey teams in British Columbia
2008 establishments in British Columbia
Ice hockey clubs established in 2008